Giovanni Bruzzaniti (born 9 September 2000) is an Italian professional footballer who plays as a winger for  club Lucchese on loan from Crotone.

Club career
Bruzzaniti started his senior career in Serie C club Gozzano.

In 2020, he joined Crotone, and was sent on loan to Pro Vercelli. On 1 September 2022, Bruzzaniti was loaned by Lucchese.

References

External links
 

2000 births
Living people
Sportspeople from the Metropolitan City of Reggio Calabria
Footballers from Calabria
Italian footballers
Association football wingers
Serie C players
A.C. Gozzano players
F.C. Crotone players
F.C. Pro Vercelli 1892 players
Lucchese 1905 players